This page is a list of the episodes of The Outer Limits, a 1995 science fiction/dark fantasy television series. The series was broadcast on Showtime from 1995 to 2000, and on the Sci Fi channel in its final year (2001–2002).

Series overview

Episodes

Season 1 (1995)

Season 2 (1996)

Season 3 (1997)

Season 4 (1998)

Season 5 (1999)

Season 6 (2000)

Season 7 (2001–02)

Story arcs and connected episodes

Innobotics Corporation
 s. 1 ep. 2 "Valerie 23"
 s. 4 ep. 15 "Mary 25"
 s. 4 ep. 2 "The Hunt"
 s. 4 ep. 26 "In Our Own Image", which includes footage from s. 3 ep. 1 "Bits of Love", as well as footage from s. 3 ep. 7 "The Camp". These timelines do not match, though this is partially remedied by the android's statement that the footage from The Camp comes from a prison camp during the Second Balkan War.
 s. 2 ep. 2 "Resurrection"

Major John Skokes/Earth Defence
 s. 1 ep. 13 "Quality of Mercy"
 s. 2 ep. 18 "The Light Brigade"

Alien Infiltration
 s. 1 ep. 20 "Birthright"
 s. 1 ep. 21 "The Voice of Reason"

Time Traveler Dr. Theresa Givens
 s. 2 ep. 1 "A Stitch in Time"
 s. 6 ep. 21 "Final Appeal"

Genetic Rejection Syndrome
 s. 2 ep. 3 "Unnatural Selection"
 s. 4 ep. 1 "Criminal Nature"

The New Masters
 s. 3 ep. 7 "The Camp" – The last humans are kept by the android guards, simply because the guards are following the last orders they received.
 s. 4 ep. 21 "Promised Land" – The remaining humans must interact with aliens still on Earth.

Geneticist Dr. Martin Nodel
 s. 3 ep. 12 "Double Helix"
 s. 4 ep. 23 "Origin of Species"

The Eastern Coalition-Free Alliance Cold War / War
 s. 4 ep. 24 "Phobos Rising"
 s. 7 ep. 22 "Human Trials"
 s. 7 ep. 21 "The Human Factor"

Jack the Ripper
 s. 5 ep. 11 "Ripper"
 s. 5 ep. 22 "Better Luck Next Time"

Time Traveler Nicholas Prentice
 s. 5 ep. 12 "Tribunal"
 s. 7 ep. 15 "Time to Time"
 s. 6 ep. 17 "Gettysburg"

USAS
 s. 4 ep. 13 "The Joining"
 s. 7 ep. 5 "The Vessel"
 s. 7 ep. 11 "In the Blood"

See also
 List of The Outer Limits (1963 TV series) episodes

References

 
 
Outer Limits, The
Outer Limits, The